Vulcanica is a genus of moths of the family Noctuidae.

Distribution
China

References
Natural History Museum Lepidoptera genus database

Noctuinae